Three Ringz (stylized as Thr33 Ringz) is the third studio album by American R&B singer T-Pain, It was released on November 11, 2008, by his record label Nappy Boy Entertainment (under the distribution of Akon's label Konvict Muzik, Jive Records, and Zomba Label Group). It was supported by three singles: "Can't Believe It" featuring Lil Wayne, "Chopped 'n' Skrewed" featuring Ludacris, and "Freeze" featuring Chris Brown.

Reviews for the album were mixed, because critics were growing weary of the party-filled track listing and overreliance on Auto-Tune. Three Ringz debuted at number four on the Billboard 200. It was nominated for Best Contemporary R&B Album at the 52nd Grammy Awards, but lost to Beyoncé's I Am... Sasha Fierce.

Singles
The album's lead single, called "Can't Believe It" was released on July 29, 2008. The track features a guest appearance from American hip hop recording artist Lil Wayne. with the production provided by T-Pain. The song peaked at number seven on the Billboard Hot 100.

The album's second single, called "Chopped 'n' Skrewed" was released on September 23, 2008. The song features a guest appearance from American rapper Ludacris, with the production, which once again was provided by T-Pain. The song reached number 27 on the Billboard Hot 100.

The album's third and final single, "Freeze" was released on October 10, 2008. The song features a guest appearance from American recording artist Chris Brown, with the production provided by T-Pain. The song peaked at number 38 on the Billboard Hot 100.

The single, "Boom" was the fourth and final single from T-Pain's repackaged album intended to be sold to the Philippines and Serbia. The track became an instant dance hit in those countries and became a staple piece of music used in hip-hop contests and shows in both Serbia and the Philippines.

Promotional singles
In late 2007, T-Pain released the first promotional single "Silver & Gold". However, it was cut from the final album track-listing. T-Pain released "Ringleader Man" as the album's promotional single.

Critical reception

Three Ringz received mixed reviews, with many music critics questioning T-Pain's continued usage of Auto-Tune and his delivery of the club tracks. Jesel Padania of RapReviews said that despite the album's lack of humor and some tracks falling short of previous efforts, he praised T-Pain's genre-hopping production and his chemistry with the guest artists. AllMusic's David Jeffries also found the humor hit or miss but praised the record's production, guest list and T-Pain's persona for giving the tracks energy to grab listeners' attention, calling it "an otherwise entertaining example of the gimmick-filled R&B/hip-hop album done right." Eric Henderson of Slant Magazine praised tracks like "Can't Believe It" and "Freeze" for their production and catchiness but questioned whether T-Pain could move beyond his Auto-Tune crutch, concluding that "T-Pain’s got the pop credentials. It’s just a pity that this entire album is drenched in what already sounded like last year’s sound a couple years ago."

J. Gabriel Boylan of Spin criticized T-Pain for utilizing the same old tricks and delivery he had used on previous works before, concluding that "With a hot guest list (Ciara, T.I.), this is bound to bump the clubs, but beyond that, it’s clown time." Elysa Gardner of USA Today found the songs about women off-putting and disgusting, and said that more empathy and tenderness would help this record, concluding that "Ringz doesn’t offer enough wit or insight to mitigate its rancor, or make it terribly interesting."

Commercial performance
Three Ringz debuted at number four on the Billboard 200, selling 167,700 copies in the first week. The album was certified gold by the Recording Industry Association of America (RIAA), selling 700,000 copies in the United States.

Track listing
 All tracks produced by T-Pain except “Karaoke”.

Notes
 The Skits and Interludes are not mentioned in the physical copies of the album
 "Change" features uncredited vocals by Mary J. Blige.

Charts

Weekly charts

Year-end charts

Certifications

Release history

References

2008 albums
Jive Records albums
T-Pain albums
Albums produced by T-Pain
Albums produced by Akon